Carex catharinensis is a tussock-forming species of perennial sedge in the family Cyperaceae. It is native to parts of eastern parts of South America.

The sedge has a short rhizome and forms can form a dense turf with many stems from the same root. It has stems with a triangular cross-section and a rough texture. The leaves can be flat or have a corrugated appearance. 

The species was first formally described by the botanist Johann Otto Boeckeler in 1896 as a part of the work Allgemeine Botanische Zeitschrift für Systematik, Floristik, Pflanzengeographie. It has one synonym; Carex fuscula subsp. catharinensis.

It is situated in subtropical biomes from southern and south eastern Brazil through Uruguay and northern Argentina.

See also
List of Carex species

References

catharinensis
Taxa named by Johann Otto Boeckeler
Plants described in 1896
Flora of Brazil
Flora of Uruguay
Flora of Argentina